The Palisade Glacier is a glacier located on the northeast side of the Palisades within the John Muir Wilderness in the central Sierra Nevada of California.

The cirque containing the Palisade Glacier has a history of thousands of years of glaciation. The modern glacier attained its last maximum extent during the Little Ice Age, between 250 and 170 years ago (a period also known as the Matthes glaciation in the Sierra Nevada). Palisade Glacier is one of the few glaciers in California that terminates in a proglacial lake dammed by its former moraine, turquoise-colored from the glacial powder suspended in the water. The Big Pine Lakes below the glacier are also the same color. Another feature of the glacier is a moulin, which was formed in a drought during 1977, and a bergschrund.

See also in the United States
List of glaciers in the United States

References

Glaciers of California
Glaciers of the Sierra Nevada (United States)
Glaciers of Inyo County, California
Inyo National Forest